The 2019 Jerusalem Volvo Open was a professional tennis tournament played on hard courts. It was the first edition of the tournament which was part of the 2019 ATP Challenger Tour. It took place in Jerusalem, between 20 and 26 May 2019.

Singles main-draw entrants

Seeds

 1 Rankings are as of 13 May 2019.

Other entrants
The following players received wildcards into the singles main draw:
  Shahar Elbaz
  Sergey Fomin
  Edan Leshem
  Yshai Oliel
  Or Ram-Harel

The following players received entry into the singles main draw using their ITF World Tennis Ranking:
  Baptiste Crepatte
  Sanjar Fayziev
  Arthur Rinderknech
  Emil Ruusuvuori
  Alexander Zhurbin

The following players received entry from the qualifying draw:
  Enrico Dalla Valle
  Julian Ocleppo

The following players received entry as lucky losers:
  Yair Sarouk
  Sem Verbeek

Champions

Singles

 Danilo Petrović def.  Filip Peliwo 7–6(7–3), 6–7(8–10), 6–1.

Doubles

 Ariel Behar /  Gonzalo Escobar def.  Evan King /  Julian Ocleppo 6–4, 7–6(7–5).

References

2019 ATP Challenger Tour
2019 in Israeli sport
May 2019 sports events in Asia
2019 in Jerusalem
Sport in Jerusalem